Kolwezi Airport  is an airport serving Kolwezi, the capital of Lualaba District in the Democratic Republic of the Congo.

Airlines and destinations

See also

Transport in the Democratic Republic of the Congo
List of airports in the Democratic Republic of the Congo

References

External links
Kolwezi Airport at OpenStreetMap
 

Kolwezi Airport at FallingRain

Airports in Lualaba Province
Kolwezi